The 1985 United Jersey Bank Classic was a women's tennis tournament played on outdoor hard courts at the Ramapo College in Mahwah, New Jersey in the United States that was part of the Category 3 tier of the 1985 Virginia Slims World Championship Series. It was the eighth edition of the tournament and was held from August 12 through August 18, 1985. A crowd of 4,083 spectators watched sixth-seeded Kathy Rinaldi win the singles title and earn $26,000 first-prize money.

Finals

Singles
 Kathy Rinaldi defeated  Steffi Graf 6–4, 3–6, 6–4

Doubles
 Kathy Jordan /  Elizabeth Smylie defeated  Claudia Kohde-Kilsch /  Helena Suková 7–6, 6–3

References

External links
 ITF tournament edition details

United Jersey Bank Classic
WTA New Jersey
United Jersey Bank Classic
United Jersey Bank Classic
United Jersey Bank Classic